Daniel Lee Harrigan (born October 29, 1955) is an American former backstroke swimmer. At the 1975 Pan American Games he won the 200 m backstroke event, but also contracted hepatitis and had to stop training for several months. He managed to recover by the 1976 Olympics and won there a bronze medal in the same event.

Harrigan studied architecture at North Carolina State University, where he swam for the NC State Wolfpack swimming and diving team in National Collegiate Athletic Association (NCAA) and Atlantic Coast Conference (ACC) competition from 1973 to 1976.

See also
 List of North Carolina State University people
 List of Olympic medalists in swimming (men)

References

1955 births
Living people
American male backstroke swimmers
NC State Wolfpack men's swimmers
Olympic bronze medalists for the United States in swimming
Sportspeople from South Bend, Indiana
Swimmers at the 1975 Pan American Games
Swimmers at the 1976 Summer Olympics
Medalists at the 1976 Summer Olympics
Pan American Games gold medalists for the United States
Pan American Games medalists in swimming
Medalists at the 1975 Pan American Games